Royal Bay is a bay,  wide and indenting , entered between Cape Charlotte and Cape Harcourt along the north coast of South Georgia.

Like other parts of the archipelago, many birds breed here, including king penguins, gentoo penguins, and blue-eyed cormorants.

History
Royal Bay was discovered and named by a British expedition under James Cook in 1775.

In 1882 a German group of the International Polar Year Investigations  expedition under Schrader was sent out to observe the transit of Venus was stationed at Royal Bay. They were based on the north shore of the bay in 1882–83. The group came in on the steam corvette  which was the first powered vessel to reach South Georgia. Moltke Harbour, a one-mile wide bay on the northwest side of Royal Bay is named after it.

See also
Köppen Point

References 
 Stonehouse, B (ed.) Encyclopedia of Antarctica and the Southern Oceans (2002)

Bays of South Georgia